Khvormiz-e Sofla (also Romanized as Khvormīz-e Soflá and Khowrmīz-e Soflá; also known as Khowrmīz-e Pā’īn) is a village in Khvormiz Rural District, in the Central District of Mehriz County, Yazd Province, Iran. At the 2006 census, its population was 2,176, in 551 families.

References 

Populated places in Mehriz County